The list of shipwrecks in February 1827 includes some ships sunk, wrecked or otherwise lost during February 1827.

6 February

7 February

10 February

12 February

15 February

16 February

17 February

19 February

21 February

22 February

24 February

25 February

26 February

27 February

28 February

Unknown date

References

1827-02